Thrainn Sigurdsson (12 November 1912 – 18 August 2004) was an Icelandic chess player.

He was one of the strongest chess players in Iceland in the early 1930s.

Sigurdsson played for Iceland in the Chess Olympiad:
 In 1933, at second board in the 5th Chess Olympiad in Folkestone (+2, =3, -9).

References

External links

Thrainn Sigurdsson chess games at 365chess.com

1912 births
2004 deaths
Icelandic chess players
Chess Olympiad competitors
20th-century chess players